The 1976–77 season was Stoke City's 70th season in the Football League and the 46th in the First Division.

The roof of the Butler Street Stand was rebuilt at a massive cost of £250,000 and with the club unable to pay off the insurers they turned to the playing staff to generate the required funds and with the likes of Jimmy Greenhoff, Alan Hudson and Mike Pejic being sold off Tony Waddington had a threadbare squad and he left the club in March 1977. Former player George Eastham took over but was unable to prevent Stoke losing their First Division status, going down by a single point.

Season review

League
The 1976–77 season opened with a new all steel Butler Street roof in place which would cost the sum of £250,000. With the club struggling to pay the cost they had to begin a fire sale of their best players. Those who left the club included Sean Haslegrave to Nottingham Forest for £35,000, Ian Moores to Tottenham Hotspur for £75,000, Jimmy Greenhoff to Manchester United for £100,000, Alan Hudson to Arsenal for £200,000 and Mike Pejic to Everton for £140,000. These were indeed, body blows none more so than Jimmy Greenhoff leaving after he scored just over 100 goals for the club and was idolised by the supporters.

The Stoke fans were totally confused at what was happening to their team and looked for someone to blame. Goals were again in short supply, Stoke failed to find the back of the net for five successive league matches from late November to early January and in fact they managed just 28 goals all season, 21 at home and seven away. Waddington's gambles on experienced player like John Tudor and Alan Suddick were not successful and after an awful defeat at home to Leicester City on 19 March 1977 Waddington's time at Stoke City was up. He had spent 25 years at the Victoria Ground as manager, assistant and coach and is considered to be the club's greatest manager having helped them win their first major trophy in 1972. He remained an avid supporter of the club until his death in 1994.

Waddington's assistant George Eastham was put in temporary charge with coach Alan A'Court his assistant. With the transfer deadline passed with no new players arrived, so Eastham turned towards the youth team to try to advert the drop, all to no avail and on a sad Monday evening at Villa Park in front of 29,000 fans, Stoke needing a win to stay up, lost 1–0 and were duly relegated to the second tier.

FA Cup
Everton beat Stoke 2–0 in the third round on their way to the semi final.

League Cup
Stoke beat Leeds United 2–1 and then lost badly 3–0 to Newcastle United.

Final league table

Results

Stoke's score comes first

Legend

Football League First Division

FA Cup

League Cup

Friendlies

Squad statistics

References

External links

Stoke City F.C. seasons
Stoke